The doubles event at the 2017 Milo Open Cali was won by Marcelo Arévalo and Miguel Ángel Reyes-Varela. Nicolás Jarry and Hans Podlipnik-Castillo were the defending champions but chose not to defend their title and did not participate in the 2017 event. Arévalo and Reyes-Varela won the title after defeating Sergio Galdós and Fabrício Neis 6–3, 6–4 in the final.

Seeds

Draw

References
 Main Draw

Milo Open Cali - Doubles
2017 Doubles